The Save River, or Sabi River (Portuguese: Rio Save) is a  river of southeastern Africa, flowing through Zimbabwe and Mozambique. It then turns south, drops over the Chivirira (“Place of Boiling”) Falls, and flows down the western side of Zimbabwe's Eastern Highlands forming a dry river valley in the rain shadow of these mountains. It is joined by the Runde River or Lundi at the Mozambique border, forming a dramatic confluence at Mahenya. It then crosses Mozambique to flow into the Indian Ocean at about 21°S.

The Save River provided irrigation for sugar plantation, but now supports the cultivation of citrus, cotton, rice, and wheat. It is also a source of small-scale fishing for the local population.

It divides Mozambique administratively, politically, ethnically and ecologically:

 During the colonial era, the administrative units of the area south of the Save changed over time, but the longer lasting were the districts of Gaza and Inhambane; presently, the Save separates the provinces of Gaza and Inhambane to the south, from those of Manica and Sofala to the north:
 Politically, the “south-of-the-Save” can be considered the stronghold of Frelimo, while the region immediately to the north is, in general, more supportive of Renamo;
 The Save separates the ethnic groups that are native speakers of  Shangaan (or Xi-Tsonga), to the south, from those that speak languages of the Shona group in the north;
 Ecologically, as the Save flows into the Indian Ocean, its mouth corresponds to the separation of tropical marine ecosystems, to the north, from the subtropical; the terrestrial ecosystems show less variation along the coastal plain north and south of the river, but inland where the Chimanimani Mountains start, a montane forest develops, which is completely different from the forests found in the south.

Villagers in the delta basin use the mangrove forests for timber and as a place for small-scale fishing. The ecology of the lower Save River basin has been affected by cyclones, flooding, erosion, and sea level rise.

Historically it was a transport route for gold and trade goods between the coast and the hinterland occupied by the civilisation of Great Zimbabwe in the 13th and 14th centuries AD.

References

 
Rivers of Zimbabwe
Rivers of Mozambique
International rivers of Africa
Geography of Gaza Province
Geography of Inhambane Province
Geography of Manica Province
Geography of Sofala Province